Dracut is the name of a town in Massachusetts. 

Dracut may also refer to: 
 dracut (initramfs), software to create a Linux initramfs